Sergio López Miró (born August 15, 1968) is a former international top swimmer from Spain, who won the bronze medal in the 200 meters breaststroke at the 1988 Summer Olympics in Seoul.

He competed in college for Indiana University and American University. López served as the head coach for the men's and women's swim teams at West Virginia University in Morgantown, West Virginia from 2005 to 2007. In 2007 he became the head swimming coach at The Bolles School in Jacksonville, Florida and has coached several swimmers onto the U.S. national team: Ariana Kukors, Charlie Houchin, Ryan Murphy and also Singapore’s Joseph Schooling.

He was appointed head coach of Singapore Swimming as well as an adviser coach of the coaching academy of the Singapore Sports Institute, with his term starting on January 1, 2015.

On April 30, 2018, Virginia Tech athletic director Whit Babcock announced Lopez's hiring as head coach for the university's swimming and diving programs.

References

External links
West Virginia University athletics profile 

1968 births
Living people
Swimmers from Catalonia
Spanish male breaststroke swimmers
Swimmers at the 1988 Summer Olympics
Swimmers at the 1992 Summer Olympics
Olympic swimmers of Spain
Olympic bronze medalists for Spain
Spanish swimming coaches
Swimmers from Barcelona
Olympic bronze medalists in swimming
Medalists at the FINA World Swimming Championships (25 m)
European Aquatics Championships medalists in swimming
Indiana Hoosiers men's swimmers
Medalists at the 1988 Summer Olympics
Mediterranean Games gold medalists for Spain
Swimmers at the 1987 Mediterranean Games
American Eagles men's swimmers
West Virginia Mountaineers swimming coaches
Mediterranean Games medalists in swimming
Spanish expatriate sportspeople in the United States
Virginia Tech Hokies swimming coaches